Belmar (foaled in 1892) was an American Thoroughbred racehorse owned by James Galway's Preakness Stables of Preakness, New Jersey.

Racing career 
Belmar was trained by Edward Feakes and ridden by future U.S. Racing Hall of Fame jockey Fred Taral. He earned his first victory just four days before he ran in the 1895 Preakness. He nonetheless went off as the second choice and won by a length. That year, the Belmont was held on November 2 because, according to the official chart, "New York Jockey Club closed out its affairs. Race run under the jurisdiction of the Westchester Racing Association." Belmar, who was the fourth choice in a field of five, won by a neck over the favorite, Counter Tenor, while carrying 7 pounds less.

In 1896, Belmar won the Manhattan Handicap at Morris Park Racecourse in The Bronx, New York. In 1897, he won the Ocean Handicap at Sheepshead Bay Race Track in Brooklyn.

In his later racing career, Belmar was owned by the handicapper "Pittsburgh Phil" and was trained by William "Bill" Smith. In a 1908 interview, Bill Smith said that Belmar was one of the best horses he ever trained and was notorious for winning his races in a close finish, usually by a head or neck. Belmar was standing at the farm of T.L. Watt in Westchester County in 1908 as a stallion for the breeding bureau.

Pedigree

References

1892 racehorse births
Racehorses bred in New Jersey
Racehorses trained in the United States
Belmont Stakes winners
Preakness Stakes winners
Thoroughbred family 21